The Norwegian National Museum of Justice, until 2016: Norsk Rettsmuseum, is a public museum of penal justice and law enforcement in Trondheim, Norway. From 2001-2017, the director of the museum was ohan Sigfred Helberg. From 2017-2018, the director was Brynja Birgisdottir and since 2019, has been Åshild Karevold. It is housed in a former prison.

Showcase and artifacts

References

Law of Norway
History of Trondheim
Museums in Trondheim
2001 establishments in Norway
Museums established in 2001
Law enforcement museums in Norway
Law museums in Europe
Prison museums in Europe